Blake Lindsley (born Norma Blake Lindsley Schlei) is an American actress.

Early life
 
She was born Norma Blake Lindsley Schlei in Los Angeles, California. She graduated from Harvard-Westlake High School in 1992 and then graduated from Yale University.

Career
Lindsley has appeared in over fifteen films and over eighteen television productions.  She has also participated in the production of a video game.

Personal life
Lindsley married Stephen Nemeth on May 30, 2010.

Filmography
Her film appearances include:
The Sessions
Hollywood Seagull (2013)
The Killer Inside Me (2010)
Betrayal (2009)
Kink (short) (2008)
Stage Kiss (2006)
Briar Patch (2003)
Coastlines (2002)
Mulholland Dr. (2001)
Time of Her Time (2000)
The Big Brass Ring (1999)
Ground Control (1998)
I Woke Up Early The Day I Died (1998)
Starship Troopers (1997)
Casualties (1997)
Dogtown (1996)
The Glimmer Man (1996)
Swingers (1996)
Getting In (1994)
Intelligent Life: Change Your Mind, Change Your World (documentary), Narrator (2009)

Television and video-game work
Lindsley's television appearances include:
Leverage  (2010)
Criminal Minds (2008)
Without A Trace (2008)
Backwoods (2008)
Sacrifices of the Heart (2007)
Wicked Wicked Games (2006)
Fashion House (2006)
CSI: Crime Scene Investigation (2000–2006)
Murder 101 (2006, TV movie)
Meet the Santas (2005, TV movie)
Cold Case (2004)
Crossing Jordan (2004)
Back When We Were Grownups (2004, TV movie)
Frasier (2004)
Mister Sterling (2003)
NYPD Blue (2002)
Philly (2002)
An American Daughter (2000, TV movie)
Star Trek: Deep Space Nine (1998)
JAG (1998)

Video-game work
 Star Trek: Klingon Academy, (2000, Live Action and Voice)

References

External links
 Blake Lindsley's official website
 

Yale University alumni
American film actresses
American television actresses
Living people
Actresses from Los Angeles
Harvard-Westlake School alumni
21st-century American women
Year of birth missing (living people)